This article is about the international Aerospace Journalist of the Year Awards (AJOYA), issued from 1996 to 2009-2010 by the World Leadership Forum, Ltd, of London, England, U.K., in conjunction with the Farnborough Air Show (England) and the Paris Air Show (France).

AJOYA should not be confused with the Australia's "Aviation Journalist of the Year" Awards, issued by that country's National Aviation Press Club (at least during 2010, in Sydney, Australia). Those awards were restricted to writers from Australia and New Zealand.

Overview
The international Aerospace Journalist of the Year Awards (AJOYA) were awards for writers and broadcasters working in the aerospace and aviation field, including specialists and those working for non-specialist titles. The awards dinner took place in mid-July (timed to coincide with the Farnborough Air Show and the Paris Air Show), and brought together aviation media and industry representatives.

The awards were organised between 1996 and 2010 by Malcolm Turner and his company (the World Leadership Forum, Ltd, of the UK) under the auspices of the Royal Aeronautical Society of the U.K. and the Aero Club of France (Aéro-Club de France).

The awards, given annually, were typically organized in a hierarchy:
 1.)  All entries in each category of each award (typically varying from seven to dozens of contestants, depending on the volume of entries—commonly in the hundreds).
...which judges narrowed down to...
 2.)  "Shortlist" finalists in each category (usually about the top 5 candidates) (Shortlists were published on the respective Awards program websites for the few months leading up to the Awards Banquet/Ceremony.)
...from which, based on judges' scores, were selected...
 3.)  ""Best in Category" winners" in each topical category, announced at the Awards Banquet/Ceremony
...from which were selected, based on judges' scores...
 4.)  The OVERALL "Aerospace Journalist of the Year," also announced at the Awards Banquet/Ceremony
...and an additional award...
 5.)  The "DECADE OF EXCELLENCE" Award was also awarded each year (based on judges' scores), for the most outstanding aerospace journalist of the previous ten years.

Trophies

The AJOYA awards were originally trophies in the form of a bronze eagle - leading the awards to become known colloquially as 'budgies', and for the competition to become known as the 'Budgie Awards'. The design of the trophy changed several times, becoming a representation of the Aerospace Journalist of the Year logo, and then a simple engraved glass 'spike'.

History
The aerospace industry's writing awards, previously for many years (1960s to mid-/late 1990s), had been awarded annually by the U.S.-based Aviation & Space Writers' Association, at a grand banquet gathering aviation industry leaders and luminaries.  That organization and its awards program dissolved, leaving a vacuum in the aviation media world.

Starting in the late 1990s, until 2009-2010, that void was filled by a British enterprise—the World Leadership Forum, Ltd. -- in collaboration with the world's two oldest aviation organizations: the Aero Club of France (Aéro-Club de France), and the Royal Aeronautical Society (of the United Kingdom).

Awards were issued in several "Category" topic areas (see lists below).

Contest entries (copies of published articles or broadcasts) were received from publications and authors, then copied and redistributed to judges in each category, who then narrowed the submissions down to a few finalists (the prestigious "Shortlist") in each category, which was then published on the organization website during the months leading up to the banquet.

The "Shortlist" candidates were invited to the Awards Banquet, where they would then discover who, among them, would be awarded the "Aerospace Journalist of the Year Award" in that respective category. Then from the category winners, a tally of judges' scores determined the one overall "Aerospace Journalist of the Year,"  and one Honoree for a "Decade of Excellence" Award.

The awards were first presented in London in 1996, and throughout the years, the presentation ceremonies have alternated between Paris and London—roughly coinciding with the world's two main airshows: the Paris Air Show and Farnborough Air Show (England), held on alternate years.

In London, the AJOYA ceremonies have taken place at the Ballroom of the Park Lane Hotel, Piccadilly, and at the Royal Courts of Justice and they directly preceded the biennial Farnborough Airshow.

The organization depended upon aerospace industry companies to sponsor the awards, and reciprocated their generosity by offering them seating with the AJOYA finalists at the awards banquet—a public-relations opportunity for aerospace industry leaders and P.R. execs to charm their industry's leading writers and opinion-shapers.

However, remotely located from most of the world's aviation media (in London or Paris, far removed from the Americas, Africa and Asia), many aerospace writers who made the awards-finalist "Shortlists" (and were thus invited to the banquet), were unable to attend—undermining the value of the banquet, and sponsorships, to AJOYA's commercial sponsors.

The awards then began to be limited to only those writers who would make the trip to the banquet, sharply reducing eligibility for the awards.

Initially, relatively few of the world's aerospace journalists competed, and the awards were almost exclusively from the U.S. and Britain, with a few contestants from Western Europe and British Commonwealth nations.

However, as the years went by, many more entered the contests, and additional categories of judging were added, and non-English entries were admitted (and translated into English for the judges), drawing contest entries from throughout the world—Russia and Eastern Europe, China and East Asia, South Asia, Latin America and Africa.

The volume of entries began to overwhelm the limited number of AJOYA judges, creating difficulties.

The global economic "Great Recession" that started in 2007 soon collapsed the aerospace industry, and forced drastic budget-tightening on nearly all aerospace companies. "Extras"—such as support of aviation organizations and programs—were cut out of many companies' budgets.

The awards ended amid rumours that they folded due to a lack of sponsorship.

The World Leadership Forum, Ltd. organization dissolved in 2009, according to the business-info website Duedil.com.

The AJOYA.com website is now off-line and the domain name is for sale.

There were no awards in 2011, and in 2012 a different organiser held a new Aerospace Media Awards dinner at the Royal Aeronautical Society in London.

Judges
Judges were chiefly leading aerospace industry editors & writers, and business/technical leaders & experts—largely chosen from the ranks of former AJOYA winners or "Shortlist" finalists—from around the world.

The judges came from aerospace industry publications such as:

 Aero Revue
 Aviation International News
 Aviation Week & Space Technology
 Business & Commercial Aviation
 Flight International
 Jane's Defence Weekly

To ensure fair judging, judges were recused from voting on their own submissions, and from voting on any other submissions from any publication for whom they wrote, or any "sister" publication (owned by the same, or a related, company).

The final list of AJOYA judges (see below) finished with the note:
"The judges have not marked any entry from their own publication/company, or any sister publication/company"

This is the last list of judges, which remained on the AJOYA.com website until 2010:

2009 Judges:
 Charles Alcock, Editorial Director, Aviation International News
 Guy Anderson, Editor, Jane's Defence Industry
 Patricia Andrighetto, Editor, Aero Revue
 James Asker, Managing Editor, Aviation Week & Space Technology
 Tom Ballantyne, Chief Correspondent, Orient Aviation
 Douglas Barrie, London Bureau Chief, Aviation Week & Space Technology
 Elaine Camhi, Editor-in-Chief, Aerospace America
 James Careless, Freelance journalist, TJT Design & Communication
 Bill Carey, Editor in Chief, Avionics Magazine
 Rob Coppinger, Technical Editor, Flight International
 Nick Fadugba, Publisher & Editor, African Aviation
 Bernard Fitzsimons, Freelance Journalist
 William Garvey, Editor-in-Chief, Business & Commercial Aviation magazine
 Ian Goold, Aviation Journalist
 Bruce Hales-Dutton, Freelance Journalist, Editor & Consultant
 Richard Harris, Aviation Writer
 Ed Hazelwood, Editor-In-Chief, Aviation Week & Space Technology
 Hans Heerkens, Aviation Analyst & Assistant Professor, University of Twente
 Johnny Keggler, Editor, Armada International
 Paul Lewis, Director of International Communications, Boeing IDS
 Alexander Mladenov, Consulting Editor, Klub Krile
 Julian Nott, Aviation Consultant
 Don Peterson, President, Universal Analyzers, Inc.
 Elliot Pulham, President & CEO, The Space Foundation
 David Rimmer, Executive Vice President, ExcelAire Service, LLC
 John Sharman, Executive Director, Spectrum Capital London, Limited
 Rod Simpson, Editor, Aviation World
 Michael Simpson, President, International Space University
 Vikramjit Singh Chopra, Editor-in-Chief, Vayu Aerospace Review
 Pierre Sparaco, Freelance journalist (former European Bureau Chief, Aviation Week & Space Technology)
 Lee Ann Tegtmeier, Managing Editor, Overhaul & Maintenance
 Aimee Turner, Senior Editor, Flight International
 Tony Velocci, Editor-in-Chief, Aviation Week & Space Technology
 Brian Walters, Freelance Journalist
 Howard Wheeldon, Senior Strategist, BGC Partners
 Mark Williamson, Space Technology Consultant

Categories
The categories for the awards include:
 Air Show Daily
 Air Show Submission
 Air Transport
 Avionics
 Breaking News
 Business Aircraft
 Business or Financial
 Defence
 General Aviation
 Maintenance
 Propulsion
 Regional Aircraft
 Safety
 Space
 Systems or Technology
 Decade of Excellence

Winners
Winners are grouped below into:
 THE DECADE OF EXCELLENCE winner (one per year)
 THE AEROSPACE JOURNALIST OF THE YEAR (overall) winner (one per year)
 The CATEGORY WINNERS (one in each category, each year)
 (NOTE:  The Shortlist finalists in each category are NOT listed below).

THE DECADE OF EXCELLENCE Award
 1996 Pierre Sparaco of Aviation Week & Space Technology
 1997 Pierre Condom of Interavia
 1998 Phillip Klass of Aviation Week & Space Technology
 1999 Jim Holahan of Aviation International News
 2000 René Francillon
 2001 Jeff Cole of the Wall Street Journal (posthumously)
 2002 Graham Warwick of Flight International
 2003 John Fricker of Aviation Week Group
 2004 Craig Covault - Aviation Week & Space Technology
 2005 Richard Aarons of Business & Commercial Aviation
 2006 Guy Norris of Flight International
 2007 William Gunston
 2008 Perry Flint
 2009 Not awarded
 2010 Not awarded

THE AEROSPACE JOURNALIST OF THE YEAR:
 1996 Eric Biass of Armada International
 1997 Robert Ropelewski of Aerospace America (posthumous)
 1998 Philip Whiteman of Pilot (UK magazine)
 1999 Kathleen Kocks of Global Airspace
 2000 Andrew Chuter of Flight International
 2001 Perry Flint of Air Transport World
 2002 James Ott of Aviation Week & Space Technology
 2003 James Canan of Aerospace America
 2004 James Donoghue Air Transport World
 2005 Kathleen Bangs of Business & Commercial Aviation
 2006 Michael Dornheim of Aviation Week & Space Technology (posthumously)
 2007 Stephen Pope
 2008 David Hughes, Aviation Week & Space Technology
 2009 Geoffrey Thomas of Air Transport World
 2010 Murdo Morrison of Flight International

The CATEGORY WINNERS in each category,
for each year were:

BEST AIR SHOW SUBMISSION
 1996 Eric Biass of Armada
 1997 James Donoghue of Air Transport World
 1998 Paul Duffy of Air Transport World
 1999 Frank Kuznik of Air & Space/Smithsonian magazine
 2000 Charles Alcock of Aviation International News
 2001 Alan Peaford of Flight Daily News
 2002 Paul Richfield of Business and Commercial Aviation
 2003 Charles Alcock of Aviation International News
 2004 John Morris & Team for 'Comanche analysis' in Show News
 2005 Mark Williamson for What's new in the industry - Satellite Evolution Asia
 2006 Tony Velocci and William Scott for Birds & blues
 2007 William B. Scott for Contract of trust - Aviation Week & Space Technology
 2008 Alan Peaford - Best of the Biggest & Fastest – India. SP's Aviation
 2009 Not known
 2010 Murdo Morrison - Visions of Arabia – Flight International

BEST AIR SHOW DAILY
 2005 Flight Daily News
 2006 Flight Daily News (Paris)
 2007 Farnborough Air Show Day 2, Flight Daily News
 2008 Charles Alcock – AIN TV Paris Air Show
 2009 AIN's MEBA Convention News
 2010 Not awarded?

BEST AIR TRANSPORT SUBMISSION
 1996 Jim Thorn of Australian Aviation (magazine)
 1997 David Learmount of Flight International
 1998 Tom Ballantyne of Orient Aviation
 1999 Hugh Field of Jets Magazine
 2000 Andrew Chuter of Flight International
 2001 John Wiley of Business & Commercial Aviation
 2002 James Ott of Aviation Week & Space Technology
 2003 Dick McKinney of Business & Commercial Aviation
 2004 Carol Matlack for 'Mega Plane' in Business Week
 2005 David Learmount for Great Escape - Flight International
 2006 Justin Wastnage for Under pressure - Flight International
 2007 Alexander Derber for Global warning: the climate change impact of aviation - Airline Fleet & Network Management
 2008 Dino Carrara – Antarctic Flyers – Air International
 2009 Jon Ostrower - A Flawed Dream - Flight International
 2010 Max Kingsley-Jones - Judging a Giant - Flight International

BEST AVIONICS SUBMISSION
 1996 Perry Flint of Air Transport World
 1997 Kieran Daly of Flight International
 1998 James Allan of Pilot (UK magazine)
 1999 Brian Walters of Air International
 2000 Stephen Pope of Aviation International News
 2001 Kathleen Kocks of Avionics Magazine
 2002 David Evans of Avionics Magazine
 2003 Stephen Pope of Aviation International News
 2004 Fred George for 'Dassault Falcon Jet's EASy cockpit' in Business & Commercial Aviation
 2005 Stephen Pope for Emerging cockpit technology - Aviation International News
 2006 Stephen Pope for The future of head-up display technology - Aviation International
 2007 Stephen Pope for The promise of synthetic vision: turning ideas into (virtual) reality - Aviation International News
 2008 David Hughes – Have Radar, Will Travel – Aviation Week & Space Technology
 2009 Bernard Fitzsimons - Avionics Upgrades & Modernisation - Aircraft Technology Engineering & Maintenance
 2010 David Esler - 4-D Nav Is Coming  – Business & Commercial Aviation

BEST BREAKING NEWS SUBMISSION
 1999 Craig Covault & Joseph Anselmo of Aviation Week & Space Technology
 2000 Craig Covault of Aviation Week & Space Technology
 2001 Pushpindar Singh of VAYU Aerospace Review
 2002 Roger Mola of Aviation International News
 2003 Paul Duffy of Air International
 2004 David Hughes & Michael Dornheim for 'No flight controls' in Aviation Week & Space Technology
 2005 Joseph Bermudez for North Korea deploys new missiles - Jane's Defence Weekly
 2006 Michael Dornheim for Skunks working - Aviation Week & Space Technology
 2007 Max Kingsley-Jones & Guy Norris for Can Boeing exploit A380 delays? - Flight International
 2008 Adrian Schofield – Unlocking China's Skies – Aviation Week & Space Technology
 2009 Robert Hewson - Questions Raised over Norway's JSF Costs - Jane's Defence Weekly
 2010 Robert Hewson - Pakistan using UAVs in 'drone war'  – JDW

BEST BUSINESS AIRCRAFT SUBMISSION
 1996 Karen Walker of Flight International
 1997 Bill Carey of Avionics Magazine
 1998 Bernard Chabbert of Pilot (UK magazine)
 1999 Stephen Pope of Aviation International News
 2000 Gordon Gilbert of Aviation International News
 2001 John Grossmann of Air & Space Magazine
 2002 Fred George and Dave Benoff of Business and Commercial Aviation
 2003 Fred George of Business & Commercial Aviation
 2004 Fred George for 'Your first Atlantic crossing' in Business & Commercial Aviation
 2005 Michael Jerram for Window on the horizon - Air International
 2006 James Asker for Reach for the sky - Aviation Week & Space Technology
 2007 Fred George for Flying the Falcon 7X - Business & Commercial Aviation
 2008 David Huntzinger – On Duty Indefinitely – Business & Commercial Aviation
 2009 Robert Mark - Defending Your Jet - Business Jet Traveler
 2010 Joe Anselmo and William Garvey - Critical Condition Image Problem  - Aviation Week & Space Technology

BEST BUSINESS OR FINANCIAL SUBMISSION
 1997 Nick Cook & Bill Sweetman of Jane's Defence Weekly
 1998 Lois Jones of Airline Business
 1999 Kathleen Kocks of Global Airspace
 2000 Gunter Endres of Airline Business
 2001 Perry Flint of Air Transport World
 2002 Anthony Velocci of Aviation Week & Space Technology
 2003 David Esler of Business & Commercial Aviation
 2004 David Esler for 'The high cost of operating in Europe' in Business & Commercial Aviation
 2005 Craig Mellow for The rise and fall and rise of Iridium - Air & Space
 2006 Günter Endres for Northern Raiders - Airline Business
 2007 Nicola Clark for How hubris and haste snarled Airbus A380 - International Herald Tribune
 2008 Jennifer Harrington – Business Aviation In China– Aviation International News
 2009 Geoffrey Thomas - Deregulation's Mixed Legacy - Air Transport World
 2010 Geoff Thomas – Reinventing Comfort – Air Transport World

BEST DEFENCE SUBMISSION
 1996 Bernard Gray of the Financial Times
 1997 Nick Cook of Jane's Defence Weekly
 1998 William Scott of Aviation Week & Space Technology
 1999 Maxi Gainza of Pilot (UK magazine)
 2000 James Canan of Aerospace America
 2001 Jim Thorn of Australian Aviation (magazine)
 2002 Bill Sweetman of International Defence Review
 2003 James Canan of Aerospace America
 2004 Andrew Brookes for 'Combat air power - past, present and future' in Air International
 2005 David Hobbs for Personal opinion: Harriers, V/STOL and all that - Aero Australia
 2006 Andrew Brookes for British air power, a radical reappraisal - Air International
 2007 Bill Sweetman for UCAVs offer fast track to stealth, long-range and carrier operations - Jane's International Defence Review
 2008 Jon Lake – Fighting Today’s Wars With Yesterday's Aircraft – Air International
 2009 Jon Lake - Secretive Nimrods - Air International
 2010 Gareth Jennings - Stretched Wings – JDW

BEST ENVIRONMENT SUBMISSION
 2004 Brian Walters for 'To a green future' in Air International

BEST GENERAL AVIATION SUBMISSION
 1996 Karen Walker of Flight International
 1997 Bernard Chabbert of Pilot (UK magazine)
 1998 Philip Whiteman of Pilot (UK magazine)
 1999 Stephan Wilkinson of Pilot (UK magazine)
 2000 Nick Bloom of Pilot (UK magazine)
 2001 John Persinos of Rotor & Wing Magazine
 2002 Stephan Wilkinson of Pilot (UK magazine)
 2003 Barry Schiff of AOPA Pilot
 2004 James Donoghue for 'A celebration of the centennial of flight' in Air Transport World
 2005 Bernard Chabbert for Love and a Lockheed - Aerospace America
 2006 Phil O'Dell for So you want to fly the Spitfire - FLYER (magazine)
 2007 Brian Lecomber for Classic biplane fly-off - FLYER (magazine)
 2008 Philip Whiteman – Single Engine Piston into Gatwick and Heathrow – FLYER (magazine)
 2009 Philip Whiteman - A Lighter Touch - FLYER (magazine)
 2010 Philip Whiteman - Fedden's Forgotten Flat Six – Today's Pilot

BEST MAINTENANCE SUBMISSION
 1996 Arthur Reed of Air Transport World
 1997 Paul Copping of Aircraft Technology Engineering & Maintenance
 1998 Susan Young of Overhaul & Maintenance
 1999 Alan Hobbs of Asia Pacific Air Safety
 2000 Jerome Chandler of Overhaul & Maintenance
 2001 David Esler of Business & Commercial Aviation
 2002 Lee Ann Tegtmeier of Overhaul & Maintenance
 2003 Paul Copping of Aircraft Technology
 2004 David Evans for 'Air Midwest crash exposes systemic shortcomings' in Air Safety Week
 2005 Chris Davis for Why and when to hire a full-time maintainer - Business & Commercial Aviation
 2006 Matt Thurber for The saga of Papa Whiskey - Aviation Maintenance
 2007 Aaron Karp for Next-generation mechanic - Air Transport World
 2008 Jerome Chandler – Inspections Now and in the Future – Overhaul & Maintenance
 2009 Niall O'Keeffe - MRO Providers Shift Their Priorities - Airline Business
 2010 Justin Cox - Oil for a smooth life – FLYER (magazine)

BEST PROPULSION SUBMISSION
 1996 Stanley Kandebo of Aviation Week & Space Technology
 1997 Ray Whitford of Air International
 1998 David Baker of Air International
 1999 Bill Gunston of Air International
 2000 Bill Gunston of Air International
 2001 Nick Cook of Jane's Defence Weekly
 2002 Rene Francillon of Air International
 2003 Robert Searles of Business & Commercial Aviation
 2004 Guy Norris for 'Pulse power' in Flight International
 2005 Miles McCallum for The technology chasm - Flyer
 2006 Bill Sweetman for The short, happy life of the prop-fan - Air & Space
 2007 James Ott for Synthetics soar - Aviation Week & Space Technology
 2008 David Esler – Alternative Fuels for Jet Engines – Business and Commercial Aviation
 2009 Lee Ann Tegtmeier - Cost versus Performance - Overhaul & Maintenance
 2010 Bill Read – Power Plants - Aerospace International

BEST REGIONAL AIRCRAFT SUBMISSION
 1996 Carole Shifrin of Aviation Week & Space Technology
 1997 Perry Bradley of Business and Commercial Aviation
 1998 Paul Copping of Aircraft Technology Engineering & Maintenance
 1999 Paul Duffy of Air International
 2000 Bernie Baldwin of Airlines International
 2001 Ian Goold of Aviation International News
 2002 Andrew Doyle, Paul Lewis and Max Kingsley-Jones of Flight International
 2003 Bernie Baldwin of Regional Airline World
 2004 Justin Wastnage for 'Delayed reaction' in Flight International
 2005 Max Kingsley-Jones, Guy Norris, Stephen Trimble & Graham Warwick for Teething troubles - Flight International
 2006 Sean Silcoff for Brazil takes flight: Embraer pulls off mission impossible - National Post (Canada)
 2007 Bernie Baldwin for Dollar dealings bring Turkish delight - Regional Airline World
 2008 Max Kingsley-Jones – E-Jet Verdict – Flight International
 2009 Scott Hamilton - Suddenly it's Very Crowded Out There -  Aviation & The Environment
 2010 Mary Kirby – Almost Heaven  – Flight International

BEST SAFETY SUBMISSION
 1998 Michael Dornheim of Aviation Week & Space Technology
 1999 David Evans of Air Safety Week
 2000 David Evans of Air Safety Week
 2001 David Carlisle of Business & Commercial Aviation
 2002 Perry Flint of Air Transport World
 2003 Gary Stoller of USA Today
 2004 Robert Mark for 'Upset training gives pilots an in-flight safety net' in Aviation International News
 2005 Kathleen Bangs for Hearing voices: intuition & accident avoidance - Business & Commercial Aviation
 2006 David Huntzinger for In the PINC - Business & Commercial Aviation
 2007 Patrick R. Veillette for Blinded by see-and-avoid - Business & Commercial Aviation
 2008 John Wiley – Lightning: Ungrounded Fears, and Real Menace – Business and Commercial Aviation
 2009 Tom LeCompte - The Disorient Express - Air & Space
 2010 David Carlisle – Wind Shear Accident – Business & Commercial Aviation

BEST SPACE SUBMISSION
 1997 Robert Ropelewski of Aerospace America (posthumous)
 1998 Joseph Anselmo of Aviation Week & Space Technology
 1999 Bill Sweetman of Jane's International Defence Review
 2000 Michael McCulley of Pilot Magazine
 2001 Erick Schonfeld of Fortune Magazine
 2002 Frank Sietzen of Aerospace America
 2003 Leonard David of Aerospace America
 2004 Bill Sweetman for 'Burt builds your ride to space' in Popular Science
 2005 Justin Mullins for Lost in space (part 1 of 3) - NewScientist
 2006 Leonard David for Europe's touchdown on Titan - Aerospace America
 2007 Bill Sweetman for Satellite micro-revolution offers the potential for broader vision - Jane's International Defence Review
 2008 Mark Williamson – Deep Impact – Launch Magazine
 2009 Craig Covault - Secret Inspection Satellites - SpaceFlight Now
 2010 Mark Williamson - Up Close and Personal – Physics World

BEST SYSTEMS OR TECHNOLOGY SUBMISSION
 1996 Perry Bradley of Business and Commercial Aviation
 1997 Guy Norris of Flight International
 1998 Bruce Dorminey of the Financial Times
 1999 Nick Cook of Jane's Defence Weekly
 2000 Frank Colucci of Vertiflite
 2001 Robert Rossier of Business & Commercial Aviation
 2002 Geoffrey Thomas of Air Transport World
 2003 Geoffrey Thomas of Air Transport World
 2004 Michael Dornheim for 'Affordable spaceship' in Aviation Week & Space Technology
 2005 Ray Whitford for Fundamentals of Airline Design (Supersonic Transports II) - Air International
 2006 David Esler for FADEC's benefits today and tomorrow - Business & Commercial Aviation
 2007 Thierry Dubois for Upstarts favor electric while establishment sits on fence - Aviation International News
 2008 Brian Walters – Aviation, An Environment Hazard? – Air International
 2009 Michael Gubisch - Ready for Departure - Aircraft Technology Engineering & Maintenance
 2010 Michael Gubisch - Graphics, graphite, and watching paint dry - Aircraft Technology Engineering & Maintenance

See also
 List of aviation awards

References

External links
 Aerospace Journalist of the Year Awards

Aviation awards
Lists of journalism awards
Aviation journalists
Awards established in 1996
July events
Aviation mass media